The Per Il Volo Top 80 is an Italian single cylinder, two-stroke aircraft engine designed and produced by Per Il Volo of Galliera Veneta for powered paragliding. It was the first purpose-designed paramotor engine.

Design and development
The Top 80 was developed specifically for the Per Il Volo Miniplane, which was introduced in 1989.

The engine uses fan-cooling and a Walbro 24 diaphragm or Dell'Orto 17.5  basin-type carburetor. With the Walbro carburetor the Top 80 produces  at 9500 rpm. Power is delivered to the two-bladed wooden propeller though a reverse-turning gear box to reduce output net torque felt by the pilot during acceleration and deceleration . The oil filled gearbox can be fitted with 22/70 gears giving a reduction ratio of 3:182, 21/71 gears giving 3.381, 20/72 gears giving 3.60, 19/73 gears giving 3.842 or 18/74 gears with a ratio of 4.111. The engine also fits a centrifugal clutch that allows idling without turning the propeller, a useful feature in its main application on a paramotor, where it improves ground safety.

Applications

Specifications (Top 80)

References

External links

Air-cooled aircraft piston engines
Per Il Volo aircraft engines
Two-stroke aircraft piston engines